The 1923–24 Mercer Bears men's basketball team represents Mercer University in the 1923–24 NCAA men's basketball season. The team won the 1924 Southern Intercollegiate Athletic Association men's basketball tournament over Centre.

References

Mercer Bears men's basketball seasons
Mercer